Braudabad is a town of Thatta District in the Sindh province of Pakistan. It lies at 24°56'13"N   67°54'6"E. Town has also a railway station which name is Braudabad railway station.

References

External links
Map of Braudabad

Thatta District